The Welsh Comedy Festival is the first Welsh Comedy Festival to be held in partnership with the Welsh children's hospice charity, Tŷ Hafan. It hosting a wide range of comedy performances and acts during the period 6–15 July 2007.  The inaugural festival opened at Gio's and moved to locations such as The Point at Cardiff Bay, The Social (Cardiff) and the Cardiff University Student's Union and included a visit to Swansea's famous Grand Theatre during the festivities organised by local stand-up comic and promoter Jeff Baker of Cracker Ass Comedy fame.

Acts included Howard Marks, Dirty Sanchez, Rhod Gilbert, Wes Packer, Jeff Baker, Frank Honeybone and Dan Mitchell (Comedian).

The BBC filmed events throughout the duration of the festival as part of their Funny Business series, screened in Autumn 2007. This series highlighted the burgeoning comic scene in Cardiff and also followed the ups and downs of hundreds of comedians all hoping to secure a £30,000 contract.

External links 
 The Point Cardiff
 Swansea Grand Theatre
 Welsh Comedy Festival Web Site

Festivals in Cardiff
Comedy festivals in Wales